Cyril J. O'Reilly (born June 8, 1958) is an American film and television actor, writer and producer.

Life and career
O'Reilly was born in Los Angeles, California. He has worked in Hollywood for nearly three decades, and is known for playing a reluctant vampire in Dance of the Damned, and for his role as Tim Cavanaugh in the teen sex comedies Porky's and Porky's II: The Next Day.

He co-starred in the 1981 television movie Splendor in the Grass with Melissa Gilbert. In 2007, twenty-six years later, the two re-united in the television movie Sacrifices of the Heart. His other film work has included roles in Airplane!, The Cool Surface and Navy SEALs. He has appeared in a variety of television programs, including ER; Star Trek: Deep Space Nine; The X-Files; Beverly Hills, 90210; St. Elsewhere; Hunter, Murder, She Wrote, and M*A*S*H.

Selected film appearances
 1980 Airplane!, Paramount as Bill
 1981 Bloody Birthday (also known as Creepers), Rearguard, 1981 as Paul, Lori's Boyfriend
 1981 Porky's (also known as Chez Porky), Twentieth Century-Fox, as Tim Cavanaugh
 1983 Porky's II: The Next Day, Twentieth Century-Fox, as Tim Cavanaugh
 1984 Purple Hearts as Zuma
 1985 Means and Ends as Jeff
 1988 Dance of the Damned, Concorde, as The Vampire
 1990 Navy Seals, Orion, as Homer Rexer
 1991 Across the Tracks, Desert Productions, as Coach Ryder
 1993 Philadelphia Experiment II, Trimark Pictures, as Decker
 1994 The Cool Surface as Gary / Eric
 1995 Excessive Force II: Force on Force as Deacon
 1995 Bloodfist VII (also known as Manhunt) as Tubbs
 1996 Carnosaur 3: Primal Species (also known as Primal Species), New Horizons, as Dolan
 1996 Midnight Blue, Motion Picture Corp. of America, as Dude
 1997 Eruption! (also known as Volcano Run), Concorde, as Sam Conway
 1998 Black Dog, Universal, as Vince
 1999 The Protector, New Horizons, as Tony Angeleno
 2000 Forever Fabulous as Cop
 2002 Stages as Scott

Television appearances

Miniseries
 1986 On Wings of Eagles, NBC, Pat Scully

Movies
 1981 Splendor in the Grass, NBC, as Bud Stamper
 1983 An Uncommon Love, CBS, as Willie
 1987 Carly's Web, NBC, as Frankie Bell
 1988 Baja Oklahoma, HBO, as Weldon Taylor
 1991 Matlock: The Witness Killings, as Russ Gifford
 1993 A Place to Be Loved (also known as Shattered Family), CBS, as Raplh Kingsley
 1996 The Unspeakable (also known as Criminal Pursuit, Roger Corman Presents The Unspeakable, and Shadow of a Scream), Showtime, as Don Holroyd
 1996 The Cottonwood, Showtime, as Carlo Shain
 1998 T.N.T., HBO,

Pilots
 1980 Skag, NBC,
 1983 Inspector Perez, NBC, as Danny McMahon

Episodic
 1981 "Catnip," Darkroom, ABC, as Ronnie Shires
 1982 "A Holy Mess," M*A*S*H, CBS, as Nick Gillis
 1987 "Schwarzald," St. Elsewhere, NBC, as Klaus
 1987 "Diminished Capacity," Houston Knights, CBS,
 1987 "The Boy Who Cried Werewolf," Werewolf, as Bobby
 1988 "Snow White, Blood Red," Murder, She Wrote, CBS, as John Dowd
 1990 "A Death in the Family," Hardball, NBC,
 1990 "Deadly Encounters: Parts 1 & 2," Hunter, NBC, as Michael Saccio
 1993 "The Game Is Chicken," Beverly Hills, 90210, Fox, as Frank Padilla
 1993 "A Killing in Cork," Murder, She Wrote, CBS, as Patrick Griffith
 1994 "Sergeant Kelly," The Commish, ABC, as Terry Ross
 1994 Terry Ross, "The Iceman Cometh," The Commish, ABC, as Terry Ross
 1994 "An Egg to Die For," Murder, She Wrote, CBS, as Leo Stone
 1995 "The Ballad of Lucas Burke," The Marshal, ABC, as Lucas Burke
 1996 "Paradise Lost," Renegade, USA Network and syndicated, as Ned Cochran
 1996 "The Brotherhood," Walker, Texas Ranger, CBS, as Frank Bodine
 1997 "Cold Storage," Viper, syndicated, as Luke Riker
 1997 "Face to Face," Night Man, The Disney Channel and syndicated, as E. Harold Bridges
 1997 "Halloween," Mike Hammer, Private Eye, syndicated, as Cory Itser
 1998 "Who Mourns for Morn?," Star Trek: Deep Space Nine, syndicated, as Nahsk
 1998 "Bad to the Bone," Night Man, The Disney Channel and syndicated, as E. Haskell Bridges
 1998 "Breaking Bread," Touched by an Angel, CBS, as Dutch Wilson
 1999 "Burnt Offerings," Profiler, NBC, as Clint Darrow
 2002 "A River in Egypt," ER, NBC, as Mike Kinney, Prisoner
 2002 "Hellbound," The X-Files, Fox, as Ed Kelso
 Amazing Grace 
 Marker

Stage appearances
 2001 The Dead Boy, Laurelgrove Theatre, Studio City, CA, as Tony McGuire

References

External links

1958 births
Living people
American male film actors
American male television actors
Male actors from Los Angeles
People from Claremont, California